Events in the year 1900 in China.

Incumbents
Guangxu Emperor (27th year)

Events

January 
 January 15, Li Hongzhang, Viceroy of Liangguang, visited Hong Kong and met with Governor Henry Arthur Blake.

March 
 March 27, Li Hongzhang, Viceroy of Liangguang, provinces reported to the central government that some of the gangsters in Hong Kong wanted to attack the provincial capital, and secretly demanded that the Governor of Hong Kong to ban.

June 
June 10–28 - Seymour Expedition
June 16–17 - Battle of Dagu Forts (1900)
 June — Zhang Decheng went to see the Viceroy of Zhili, Yu Lu. He presented himself to him as the founder of the Boxer movement, and the viceroy promised to provide the Boxers with money and equipment.[2]
June 20 – August 14 - Siege of the International Legations
 June Taiyuan Nationalist reaction in China against Christian missionaries and churches claimed more than thirty-two thousand lives. The worst massacres occurred in the northern province of Shanxi, particularly Taiyuan.

July 
July 13–14 - Battle of Tientsin

August 
August - Gaselee Expedition
August 5 - Battle of Beicang
August 6 - Battle of Yangcun
August 14–15 - Battle of Peking (1900)

September 
September 20 - Battle of Beitang

other 
Boxer Rebellion
Battle of Shanhaiguan (1900)
Boxers attacks on Chinese Eastern Railway
Defence of Yingkou
Battle of Pai-t'ou-tzu
Battles on Amur River (1900)
Russian Invasion of Northern and Central Manchuria (1900)

Births
June 17 - Xu Haidong
June 30 - Zhang Wentian
December 8 - Sun Li-jen
Xia Minghan
Zhou Shidi

Deaths
 July - Nie Shicheng
 Ma Fulu
 Xu Jingcheng
 Tang Caichang
 Ma Haiyan
 Consort Zhen

References 

 
Years of the 19th century in China